The 1999–2000 WHL season was the 34th season for the Western Hockey League.  Eighteen teams completed a 72-game season.  The Kootenay Ice won the President's Cup.

League notes
The WHL followed the NHL's lead and adopted the "regulation tie" format that saw a team losing in overtime earn a point.
Overtime was to be played 4 on 4.

Regular season

Final standings

Scoring leaders
Note: GP = Games played; G = Goals; A = Assists; Pts = Points; PIM = Penalties in minutes

Goaltending leaders
Note: GP = Games played; Min = Minutes played; W = Wins; L = Losses; T = Ties ; GA = Goals against; SO = Total shutouts; SV% = Save percentage; GAA = Goals against average

2000 WHL Playoffs
Top eight teams in the Eastern Conference (East and Central divisions) qualified for playoffs
Top six teams in the Western Conference (division) qualified for the playoffs

Conference quarterfinals

Eastern Conference

Western Conference

Conference semifinals

Conference finals

WHL Championship

All-Star game

On January 19, the Eastern Conference defeated the Western Conference 10–9 at Kelowna, British Columbia before a crowd of 5,420.

WHL awards

All-Star Teams

See also
2000 Memorial Cup
2000 NHL Entry Draft
1999 in sports
2000 in sports

References
whl.ca
 2005–06 WHL Guide

Western Hockey League seasons
WHL
WHL